Spelaeorhynchus is a genus of mites placed in its own family, Spelaeorhynchidae, in the order Mesostigmata. It contains five recognized species:

 Spelaeorhynchus praecursor Neuman, 1902
 Spelaeorhynchus hutsoni Martyn, 1988
 Spelaeorhynchus jimi Peracchi, 1992
 Spelaeorhynchus soaresi Peracchi, 1992
 Spelaeorhynchus wenzeli Peracchi, 1992

References

Mesostigmata